The 1st Iowa Infantry Regiment was an infantry regiment that served in the Union Army during the American Civil War.

Service
The 1st Iowa Infantry was organized at Keokuk, Iowa and mustered into Federal forces on May 14, 1861, for ninety days' service under Abraham Lincoln's first call for volunteers.

The regiment was mustered out on August 20, 1861.

Total strength and casualties
Unit strength was 959.  The regiment suffered 1 officer and 19 enlisted men who were killed in action or who died of their wounds and 8 enlisted men who died of disease, for a total of 28 fatalities.

Wilson's Creek
The loss of the regiment at Wilson's Creek was 13 killed, 141 wounded and 4 missing.

Commanders
 Colonel John F. Bates
 Lieutenant Colonel William H. Merritt

See also
List of Iowa Civil War Units
Iowa in the American Civil War

Notes

References
The Civil War Archive

Units and formations of the Union Army from Iowa
1861 establishments in Iowa
Military units and formations established in 1861
Military units and formations disestablished in 1861